Eva Ström (born 4 January 1947 in Lidingö, Stockholm County) is a Swedish lyricist, novelist, biographer and literary critic. She made her literary debut in 1977 with the poetry collection Den brinnande zeppelinaren. Ström trained as a physician and worked in the medical profession 1974-1988 before becoming a full-time author.

She was awarded the Nordic Council's Literature Prize in 2003 for the poetry collection Revbensstäderna ("The Rib Cities"). In January 2010, she was elected a member of the Royal Swedish Academy of Sciences.

She is the mother of Karin Ström.

Awards
Nordic Council's Literature Prize 2003
Jan Smrek Prize 2018, Slovakia

References

1947 births
Living people
People from Lidingö Municipality
Swedish women novelists
Swedish women physicians
Members of the Royal Swedish Academy of Sciences
Nordic Council Literature Prize winners
Litteris et Artibus recipients
Swedish women poets
20th-century Swedish women writers
21st-century Swedish women writers
20th-century Swedish poets
21st-century Swedish poets
Swedish literary critics
Women literary critics
21st-century Swedish physicians
20th-century Swedish physicians
20th-century women physicians